The 2019 Indian general election were held in Karnataka on Two phases- 18 and 23 April 2019 to constitute the 17th Lok Sabha.

Voter's Turnout 

First phase election on 18 April with highest voting recorded in Mandya of 80.24% and the lowest is recorded in Bangalore South of 53.48% as per the official announcement from Election CEO of Karnataka.

Results

Coalition wise - Party result

Party wise

Constituency-wise results

Candidates list

Opinion Polls

Assembly segments wise lead of Parties

References

Indian general elections in Karnataka
2010s in Karnataka
Karnataka